São João do Campo is a civil parish in the municipality of Coimbra, Portugal. The population in 2011 was 2,073, in an area of 7.92 km2. It was originally called Cioga do Campo and colloquially as Lavarrabos.

References 

Freguesias of Coimbra